Sapnon Ka Mandir is a 1991 Indian Hindi-language drama film, produced by Suresh Kumar under the Kamla Productions banner and directed by Pradip Jain. It stars Jeetendra, Jaya Prada in the pivotal roles and music composed by Laxmikant–Pyarelal.

Plot
Sanjay (Jeetendra) falls in love with Sangeeta (Jayapradha)  and get married with her. Their desire to have many children is marred for Sangeeta, who can have only one child, who turns to be a healthy baby boy Sonu. The boy grows up into an intelligent school student. 
One day, when he does not return from school, his parents panic and frantically search for him everywhere. The only two suspects they have in mind are Gulu (Gulshan Grover), who still lusts after Sangeeta; and Maulah Baba (Kader Khan), a blind beggar who used to meet Sonu every day at school time, only because he loved him. Sonu falls asleep in school and the school is locked for 10 days. The teacher rings to tell Sanjay that she feels his son is locked in school, but Gulu, who had entered the house in the absence of Sanjay and Sangeeta to rob them, picks up and says 'Ok'. He takes advantage of the situation and asks Sanjay for money so he can escape with the money he gets. 
By the time, Sanjay and Sangeeta's dog Sando comes running to the school and Sonu asks him to please go and get his dad. He runs off for the same, but on the way, vets grab him and take him away, thinking of him as a stray dog. There, he pretends to be dead. When the vet opens the door, he runs and goes to Maulah Baba and takes him to the school. They break the lock and get Sonu out. But Gulu arrives on the scene and kills Maulah Baba. Police come and take Gulu. Sonu runs home with his dog and is reunited with his parents.

Cast
 Jeetendra as Sanjay Sharma
 Jaya Prada as Sangeeta Sharma
 Kader Khan as Maulah Baba
 Asrani as Sangeeta's mama
 Gulshan Grover as Gulu
 Sripradha as Sheetal
 Master Sunny as Sanjay's & Sangeeta's son, Sonu
 Master Ryan as Sonu's side-kick
 Champak Banerjee as Kallu
 Johnny Walker

Soundtrack

References

External links

1990s Hindi-language films
1991 films
Films scored by Laxmikant–Pyarelal